Yoo Hong-Youl(born December 30, 1983) is a South Korean football player who currently plays for TTM Lopburi in the Thai Division 1 League.

References

 

1983 births
Living people
South Korean footballers
Jeonnam Dragons players
K League 1 players
Korea National League players
South Korean expatriate footballers
Expatriate footballers in Thailand
South Korean expatriate sportspeople in Thailand
Association football forwards